A Marriage Below Zero is a novel by Alan Dale. Published in 1889, it has been described as the first English-language novel portraying a romantic relationship between two men. It is a melodrama told from the point of view of a young woman whose marriage is threatened when her husband engages in an affair with another man.

Plot
The book is told from the point of view of Elsie Bouverie, a pretty, frivolous English girl who falls in love with handsome, quiet Arthur Ravener. They marry, and Elsie gradually comes to realise that she has competition for Arthur's affection in the form of Captain Dillington, Arthur's male lover. Elsie engages a private detective who provides her with an address in Notting Hill; she goes there to find Dillington and Arthur together. Elsie and Arthur leave London for New York City. While there they attend a service given by a clergyman who preaches against sodomy. This affects Arthur to such an extent that he leaves Elsie. Some years later, Elsie travels to Paris where she believes Arthur and Dillington have become involved in a homosexual scandal. She goes to the hotel where she believes Arthur is staying, only to find him dead in his room.

Major themes
The book is notable for its portrayal of a gay romance at a time when mainstream fiction avoided this topic. It is the first English-language gay-themed novel, and establishes the pattern of gay novels ending in death: especially suicide. Its melodramatic format is closely linked to its author's occupation as a New York drama critic at a time when the primary American theatre form was melodrama.

Its publication roughly coincided with the Cleveland Street scandal, a case that had been developing for years involving a London gay brothel.

Publication history
 1889, USA, G.W. Dillingham, Paperback
 2012, USA, Nabu Press, Paperback (reprint)
 2017, USA, Amazon Digital Services (Kindle edition)
 2017, Canada, Broadview, Paperback

Reception
The book met with mixed reviews. An anonymous reviewer in Bedford's Magazine described it as "A saturnalia in which the most monstrous forms of human vice exhibit themselves shamelessly"; while an approving review in the New York World described it as "Absolutely unconventional".

See also
 List of gay novels prior to the Stonewall riots

References

Bibliography
 
 
 
Kaye, Richard A.,"The Return of Damon and Pythias: Alan Dale's "A Marriage Below Zero", Victorian Melodrama, and the Emergence of a Literature of Homosexual Representation," College Literature, Vol. 29, No. 2 (Spring, 2002), pp. 50–79

1880s LGBT novels
1889 American novels
Adultery in novels
American LGBT novels
Novels about marriage
Novels set in London
Novels set in New York City
Novels set in Paris
Novels with gay themes